Wentworth may refer to:

People
 Wentworth (surname)
 Judith Blunt-Lytton, 16th Baroness Wentworth (1873–1957), Lady Wentworth, notable Arabian horse breeder
 S. Wentworth Horton (1885–1960), New York state senator
 Wentworth Miller (born 1972), American actor

Places

Australia 
 Division of Wentworth, an electoral district in the Australian House of Representatives in New South Wales
 Electoral district of Wentworth, a former electoral district in the New South Wales Legislative Assembly
 Wentworth, New South Wales, a town
 Wentworth Gaol, former prison in New South Wales

Canada 
 Ski Wentworth, a ski hill in Wentworth, Nova Scotia, Canada
 Wentworth, Nova Scotia, a rural community
 Wentworth, Quebec, a township municipality
 Wentworth County, Ontario, a defunct county
 Wentworth (electoral district), a former riding in the Canadian House of Commons
 Wentworth (provincial electoral district). a former riding in the Legislative Assembly of Ontario
 Wentworth, Calgary, a community in Calgary, Alberta

South Africa 
 Wentworth, KwaZulu-Natal, a township of Durban

United Kingdom 
 Wentworth, Cambridgeshire, a village
 Wentworth Club, a golf club in Surrey
 Wentworth College, York, a college of the University of York
 Wentworth Estate, Surrey
 Wentworth, South Yorkshire, a village and civil parish
 Wentworth (UK Parliament constituency), an electoral district in South Yorkshire
 Wentworth Woodhouse, a Grade I listed country house in the village of Wentworth, and the largest private house in the UK

United States 
 Wentworth by the Sea (formerly the Hotel Wentworth), a historic hotel in New Castle, New Hampshire
 Wentworth Institute of Technology, a college in Boston, Massachusetts
 Wentworth Military Academy and College, a boarding school and college in Lexington, Missouri
 Wentworth, Missouri, a village
 Wentworth, New Hampshire, a town
 Wentworth, North Carolina, a town
 Wentworth Mansion, Charleston, South Carolina, a historic hotel
 Wentworth, South Dakota, a village

Television 
 Wentworth (TV series), an Australian television drama series, a reimagining of Prisoner (see below)
 Wentworth Detention Centre, in the Australian television series Prisoner

Other uses 
 Baron Wentworth, a title in the Peerage of England
 J.G. Wentworth, a financial services firm

See also 
 Wentworth letter, a letter by Joseph Smith, Jr. to the editor of Chicago Democrat explaining the message of the LDS Church
 Wentworth scale, a scale for the grain size of sedimentary materials